Mount Essinger is a peak rising to , surmounting the most eastern massif of the Cathedral Rocks in the Royal Society Range, in Victoria Land. It was named in 1992 by the Advisory Committee on Antarctic Names in association with Chaplains Tableland after Lieutenant Commander Jesse W. Essinger, a U.S. Navy chaplain with the 1968 winter party at McMurdo Station.

References 

Mountains of Victoria Land
Scott Coast